was a Japanese rower. He competed in the coxed pair event at the 1936 Summer Olympics.

References

External links

1913 births
Year of death missing
Rowers at the 1936 Summer Olympics
Japanese male rowers
Olympic rowers of Japan